Passive matrix addressing is an addressing scheme used in early LCDs. This is a matrix addressing scheme meaning that only m + n control signals are required to address an m × n display.  A pixel in a passive matrix must maintain its state without active driving circuitry until it can be refreshed again.

The signal is divided into a row or select signal and a column or video signal.  The select voltage determines the row that is being addressed and all n pixels on a row are addressed simultaneously. When pixels on a row are being addressed, a Vsel potential is applied, and all other rows are unselected with a Vunsel potential. The video signal or column potential is then applied with a potential for each m columns individually. An on-switched (lit) pixel corresponds to a Von, an off-switched (unlit) corresponds to a Voff potential.

The potential across pixel at selected row i and column j is

and

for the unselected rows.

Passive matrix addressed displays, such as Ferro Liquid Display, do not need the switch component of an active matrix display, because they have built-in bistability. Technology for electronic paper also has a form of bistability. Displays with bistable pixel elements are addressed with a passive matrix addressing scheme, whereas  TFT LCD displays are addressed using active addressing.

See also
 Active matrix addressing
 Pixel geometry
 Liquid crystal display

References

Digital imaging
Liquid crystal displays